Events during the year 1975 in Northern Ireland.

Incumbents
Secretary of State - Merlyn Rees

Events
31 July – Miami Showband killings: Three members of The Miami Showband, together with two paramilitaries, are killed in an Ulster Volunteer Force ambush in County Down as they return home to Dublin from playing at a dance in Banbridge.

Arts and literature
14 May – Patrick Galvin's We Do It For Love, a satire on The Troubles, opens at the Lyric Theatre (Belfast).
October – Stewart Parker's Spokesong opens at the Lyric (Belfast); his play I’m a Dreamer, Montreal is also written this year.
The punk rock/new wave band which will become The Undertones is formed in Derry.
William Peskett's poems The Nightowl's Dissection are published.

Sport

Football
Irish League
Winners: Linfield
Ballinamallard United F.C. established

Irish Cup
Winners: Coleraine 1 – 1, 0 – 0, 1 – 0 Linfield

Births
18 February – Keith Gillespie, international soccer player.
9 June – Brian Magee, boxer.
24 July – Gordon Cooke, cricketer.
27 August – Kyle McCallan, cricketer.
4 September – Andrew Patterson, cricketer.
13 October – Oisín McConville, Armagh Gaelic footballer.
4 November – Warren Christie, actor.

Full date unknown
Cara Dillon, folk singer.
Nick Laird, novelist and poet.

Deaths
23 February – Ernest Blythe, writer, journalist and theatre manager, member of 1st Dáil and Cabinet Minister (born 1889).
28 April – Billy McMillen, Official Irish Republican Army officer, killed in feud with Irish National Liberation Army (born 1927).
25 October – Padraig Marrinan, artist (born 1906).
25 November – Moyna Macgill, stage and film actress, mother of Angela Lansbury (born 1895).

See also
1975 in Scotland
1975 in Wales

References

 
Northern Ireland